Blackleach Country Park is a country park in Walkden, Greater Manchester. It is situated half a mile from the town centre just off Bolton Road in the Hill Top area. It is a Local Nature Reserve and a winner of the Green Flag Award.

History 
Blackleach Country Park was in an old industrial area of Walkden which had chemical works.

One of the more famous factories of the Blackleach site was a factory which produced dyes. Adjacent to the factory was a large mound of waste, known locally as "Stink Bomb Hill", due to the strong sulphurous smell that emanated from it. Some of the dyes were accidentally released into the air, and one of the hills in the park became a striking purple at its peak. Rumours spread about the hill and people began taking children, suffering with whooping cough, up the hill, believing it would cure them. White clothes hung up on neighbouring washing lines would also be tinged purple.

References 

Parks and commons in Salford
Country parks in Greater Manchester
Local Nature Reserves in Greater Manchester